Deramas treadawayi is a butterfly of the family Lycaenidae first described by Hisakazu Hayashi in 1981. It is found on Mindanao in the Philippines.

References

Hayashi, Hisakazu (1981). "New Lycaenid Butterflies from the Philippines". Tyô to Ga. 32 (1,2): 63–82.
Treadaway, C. G. (1995). "Checklist of the butterflies of the Philippine Islands (Lepidoptera: Rhopalocera)". Nachrichten des Entomologischen Vereins Apollo. Suppl. 14: 7–118.

Treadaway, Colin G. & Schrőder, Heintz G. (2012). "Revised checklist of the butterflies of the Philippine Islands (Lepidoptera: Rhopalocera)". Nachrichten des Entomologischen Vereins Apollo. Suppl. 20: 1-64.

Butterflies described in 1981
Deramas